Hemmatabad Rural District is a rural district (dehestan) in the Central District of Borujerd County, Lorestan Province, Iran. At the 2006 census, its population was 23,249, in 5,630 families.  The rural district has 50 villages.

References 

Rural Districts of Lorestan Province
Borujerd County